Michael Alan Buss (born 24 January 1944 in Brightling, Sussex) is an English former cricketer active from 1961 to 1978 who played for Sussex. He appeared in 316 first-class matches as a lefthanded batsman who bowled slow left arm . Tony Buss is his brother. He scored 11,996 runs with a highest score of 159 among eleven centuries and took 547 wickets with a best performance of seven for 58.

Notes

1944 births
English cricketers
Sussex cricketers
Marylebone Cricket Club cricketers
Free State cricketers
People from Brightling
Living people
Marylebone Cricket Club Under-25s cricketers